This is a table of surface tension values for some interfaces at the indicated temperatures. Note that the SI units millinewtons per meter (mN·m−1) are equivalent to the cgs units dynes per centimetre (dyn·cm−1).

References

External links
More values on
 http://www.surface-tension.de/

Fluid mechanics
Surface science